Ingi Björn Albertsson (born 3 November 1952) is an Icelandic retired footballer who played as a striker, and former manager of the Icelandic Úrvalsdeild. After his playing career, he moved to politics and was a congressman at the Althing, the Icelandic parliament, first in 1987 - 1991 for Vesturlandskjördæmi for the Citizen's party (split parties midway through the term) and then in 1991-1995 for Reykjavík for the Independence party. Albertsson was one of the top scorers in Icelandics top division ever with 126 goals, and is currently second in the all-time table, behind Tryggvi Guðmundsson.

Personal life
Albertsson's father Albert Guðmundsson is Iceland's first professional footballer. Albertsson's daughter, Kristbjörg Ingadóttir, was also a footballer and international for Iceland women's national football team. She married the Icelandic international professional footballer Guðmundur Benediktsson, and their son Albert Guðmundsson (named after Albertsson's father) is also a professional footballer and international for the Iceland national football team.

References

External links

Althingi Profile

RSSSF Icelandic top scorers

1952 births
Living people
Footballers from Nice
Ingi Bjorn Albertsson
Ingi Bjorn Albertsson
Ingi Bjorn Albertsson
Ingi Bjorn Albertsson
French footballers
Ingi Bjorn Albertsson
Association football defenders
Ingi Bjorn Albertsson
Ingi Bjorn Albertsson
Ingi Bjorn Albertsson
Ingi Bjorn Albertsson
Ingi Bjorn Albertsson
Ingi Bjorn Albertsson
Ingi Bjorn Albertsson